The 1910 Tulane Olive and Blue football team was an American football team that represented Tulane University as an independent during the 1910 college football season. In its first year under head coach Appleton A. Mason, Tulane compiled a 0–7 record.

Schedule

References

Tulane
Tulane Green Wave football seasons
College football winless seasons
Tulane Olive and Blue football